Jeanne-Marie Marsan, born Chapiseau (1746 – 25 February 1807), was a French dramatic actress and an opera singer, active in France and Germany in Europe, in the French West Indies and Louisiana.  She was the leading actress and opera singer in Saint-Domingue (pre-revolutionary Haiti), and later in the first theatre in New Orleans in Louisiana.

Biography 

Born in the Faubourg Saint-Germain of Paris, she married the actor Pierre Legendre Marsan, who was forced to flee from France to Martinique in 1765. Jeanne-Marie stayed in France and during the following ten years made herself famous on the stages of Paris, the French provinces, and Germany before travelling with her children to join her husband in Martinique in 1775, where she made a successful debut on the stage of the theatre in Saint-Pierre.

Saint Domingue
In 1780, Marsan and her family moved to Haiti, where she was hired at the Cap-Français theatre and became the leading actress and singer in the colony. She was renowned for her versatility, performing in tragedy as well as comedy, spoken drama as well as opera. A letter that appeared in a Port-au-Prince newspaper on 10 March 1787 praised her performance in the role of "Nina": 
 

In June 1793, Marsan was likely among the 10.000. refugees evacuated from Cap-Francais on American ships during the Great Fire and Pillage of Cap-Français.  During the incident, most of the city was burnt and the white population took refuge in the ships of the harbour, and eyewitnesses describes scenes in which the rebels put on the costume from the Comédie du Cap.   Many of the actor of the theatre were to have been in New Orleans in 1794.

New Orleans
In the 1795–96 season, Marsan is confirmed to have been in New Orleans as the leading actress and singer of the Théâtre de la Rue Saint Pierre in New Orleans. Marsan is believed to have sung the principal female part in Silvain – reputed to be the first opera ever performed in New Orleans – on 22 May 1796. She was already famous for this role in Haiti. When the order of the theatre was established in the contract of 1797, she was among the actors granted benefit performances, and together with Clerville and Delaure, the highest-paid actor altogether with a salary of §70.

When the theatre was closed in 1800, Marsan retired from the stage and lived on the income from a property bought for her by the actor Jean Baptiste Le Sueur Fontaine, director of the New Orleans theatre and previously director of the Cap-Francais theatre, where she was earlier employed.

She died in New Orleans in 1807.

References 

 The New Orleans Theatre 1792–1803 Southern Quarterly,  Spring 2007  by Gardeur, René J Le Jr
 John G. Cale, French Secular Music in Saint-Domingue (1750–1795) Viewed as a Factor in America's Musical Growth, Louisiana State University and Agricultural & Mechanical College, 1971
 Jean Fouchard, Le Théâtre à Saint-Domingue (1955)
 Jean Fouchard, Artistes et Répertoires des Scènes de Saint-Domingue (1955)

1746 births
1807 deaths
18th-century French actresses
Haitian stage actresses
People from Cap-Haïtien
People from Port-au-Prince
People of Saint-Domingue
People of Colonial Spanish Louisiana
18th-century French women opera singers
18th-century American actresses
American stage actresses